Haplochromis simpsoni is a species of cichlid endemic to Lake Nabugabo in Uganda.  This species reaches a length of  SL.

References

Lake fish of Africa
Endemic freshwater fish of Uganda
Fish described in 1965
simpsoni
Taxonomy articles created by Polbot